Bilhaur Assembly constituency is a part of the Kanpur Nagar district and it comes under Misrikh Lok Sabha constituency.

Members of Legislative Assembly

Election results

2022

2017

References

External links
 

Assembly constituencies of Uttar Pradesh
Politics of Kanpur